Gregory Behrendt (born July 21, 1963) is an American comedian and author. His work as a script consultant to the HBO sitcom Sex and the City paved the way for co-authoring of the New York Times bestseller He's Just Not That Into You (2004), later adapted into a film by the same name. Apart from that he also hosted two short-lived television shows, The Greg Behrendt Show (2006) and Greg Behrendt's Wake Up Call (2009).

Early life and education
Greg Behrendt graduated with a Bachelor of Arts degree in theater from the University of Oregon in 1991, though initially he had enrolled to be a business major and to play rugby.

Career
After graduation, Behrendt moved to San Francisco, where he joined an improvisational troupe, and met fellow comic Margaret Cho. In his early years, he performed comedy and improv in San Francisco.  He was a member of the improv troupe Crash and Burn, whose members included Margaret Cho. He came up as a performer alongside such comics as David Cross (with whom he roomed for years) and Patton Oswalt.

He went on to appear on The Tonight Show and Late Night with Conan O'Brien. His stand-up special, Greg Behrendt is Uncool, debuted on Comedy Central in January 2006.

In June 2006, he appeared on Celebrity Poker Showdown, playing for a domestic violence charity. Behrendt was a script consultant for the HBO sitcom Sex and the City, "offering script notes from the perspective of a straight man to the writing team, composed of women and gay men".

With Liz Tuccillo, Behrendt co-wrote the 2004 self-help book He's Just Not That Into You.  It was adapted by Drew Barrymore's Flower Films/Warner Bros. as a movie of the same name, premiering February 6, 2009.

With his wife Amiira Ruotola-Behrendt, he co-wrote It's Called a Breakup Because It's Broken.

He released the book It's Just a Date! in the UK.

His daily daytime "self-help" talk show, The Greg Behrendt Show, premiered September 12, 2006, four months later Sony Pictures Television announced, in January 2007 that the series would not have a second season, and the show aired its last new episodes in February 2007.

He also did a mid-season program for the 2006–07 television season Greg Behrendt's Wake-Up Call for ABC, which never aired on the network. The program began airing in January 2009 on ABC's sister cable network SoapNet. He also appeared on the Great Debate at the 2010 Melbourne Comedy Festival, in which he argued as the third speaker for the negative team on the debate "Food Is Better Than Sex". Behrendt's team, made up of New Zealand comedian Cal Wilson, English comedian Russell Kane and Behrendt himself, won the comedy event.

He started the podcast Walking the Room with his friend Dave Anthony.

Personal life
He is married to Amiira Ruotola. They have two daughters, Mighty Luna and Bella True. He is a recovering alcoholic. He plays guitar in his own surf/rockabilly instrumental band, The Reigning Monarchs.

In June 2015, Behrendt announced via his Facebook Fan Page that he was battling cancer, and had undertaken three rounds of chemotherapy. He discussed his diagnosis on episode 16TF of Jimmy Pardo's podcast "Never Not Funny", as well as Wil Anderson's podcast "Wilosophy" on July 9, 2015. He stated that he had a form of lymphoma. His cancer is in remission as of late 2015.

Literary works
 Pocket Guide to He's Just Not That into You: The No-excuses Truth to Understanding Guys, with Liz Tuccillo. Peter Pauper Press, Inc., 2005. .

Comedy albums
 Greg Behrendt Is Uncool (2006)
 That Guy From That Thing (2009)
 Original Uncool (2011)
 (contains much of the same material as Greg Behrendt Is Uncool)
 Why Are You In Here? (2018)

References

External links
 Greg Behrendt's official website
 
 Greg Behrendt Does Not Rock, a short film
 Interview with Greg Behrendt at WickedInfo.com

1963 births
Living people
American television writers
American male television writers
American male non-fiction writers
American stand-up comedians
Writers from San Francisco
American self-help writers
American television talk show hosts
University of Oregon alumni
Contestants on American game shows
American male screenwriters
20th-century American comedians
21st-century American comedians
Screenwriters from California
Comedians from California